The 66th Annual Primetime Creative Arts Emmy Awards ceremony was held on August 16, 2014, at the Nokia Theatre in Downtown Los Angeles. The ceremony is in conjunction with the annual Primetime Emmy Awards and is presented in recognition of technical and other similar achievements in American television programming, including guest acting roles.

The Academy of Television Arts & Sciences announced that it will implement online voting for its members to select the nominees. Winners for this year were voted on via paper ballots; online voting to determine the winners will not be used until 2015.

The nominees were announced on July 10, 2014. The Governor's Award and juried award winners in Animation and Costumes for a Variety Series were announced on July 31, 2014. Six Interactive Media juried awards were announced on August 13, 2014.

Winners and nominees
Winners are listed first and highlighted in bold:

Governor's Award
 Marion Dougherty (posthumous)

Programs

Acting

Animation

Art Direction

Casting

Choreography

Cinematography

Commercial

Costumes

Directing

Hairstyling

Hosting

Interactive Media

Lighting Design / Direction

Main Title Design

Make-up

Music

Picture Editing

Sound

Special Visual Effects

Stunt Coordination

Technical Direction

Writing

References

External links
 Academy of Television Arts and Sciences website

066 Creative Arts
2014 in American television
2014 in Los Angeles
2014 television awards
2014 awards in the United States
May 2014 events in the United States